34-40 King Street is a heritage-listed row of terraced houses in East Maitland, City of Maitland, New South Wales, Australia. It was added to the New South Wales State Heritage Register on 2 April 1999.

History 

The terraces were built  1840.

Description

It consists of a row of single-storey stone terraces in the Colonial Georgian style with corrugated iron hipped roofs.

The City of Maitland describes it as an "exceptional and relatively rare example in New South Wales of a small-scale nineteenth-century single-storey terrace row, and notes that it "represents the earliest phases of the town's residential development and a tangible record of the lifestyle of the working class in the mid-nineteenth century".

Heritage listing 

34-40 King Street was listed on the New South Wales State Heritage Register on 2 April 1999.

See also

References

Attribution 

New South Wales State Heritage Register
East Maitland, New South Wales
Houses in New South Wales
Articles incorporating text from the New South Wales State Heritage Register